Goh Choon Aik is a Malaysian politician from PKR. He has been the Member of Penang State Legislative Assembly for Bukit Tambun since 2018.

Early career 
He is a Registered Town Planner for 13 years and a corporate member of the Malaysia Institute of Planners. He began his career with Penang Development Corporation as Town & Country Planning Officer in 1998, before joining GCA Planning Consultants & GCA Planning Sdn Bhd in 2005, where he is currently the Principal. He also served as Municipal Councillor in Seberang Perai City Council from 2008 to 2010.

Election results

Reference 

People's Justice Party (Malaysia) politicians
Members of the Perak State Legislative Assembly
Malaysian people of Chinese descent
Living people
1974 births